The Edwin C. Johnson House is a historic house at 177 Weston Street/8 Caldwell Street in Waltham, Massachusetts.  The -story wood-frame house was built c. 1847–53, and is a well-preserved example of transitional Greek Revival/Italianate styling.  Its massing, with a center entrance, are indicative of Italianate styling, but it also has corner pilasters.  The entry surround is Greek Revival, with sidelight and transom windows, and a dentillated pediment.

The house was listed on the National Register of Historic Places in 1989.

See also
National Register of Historic Places listings in Waltham, Massachusetts

References

Houses in Waltham, Massachusetts
Houses on the National Register of Historic Places in Waltham, Massachusetts
Italianate architecture in Massachusetts
Houses completed in 1847
1847 establishments in Massachusetts